Michael Fraser Irvine (born 21 October 1939) is a former British Conservative Party politician.

Political career
He stood for Bishop Auckland at the 1979 general election, but was defeated by Labour's Derek Foster.

Against the national trend, Irvine was elected Member of Parliament (MP) for Ipswich at the 1987 general election, unseating the Labour incumbent Kenneth Weetch. At the subsequent 1992 general election, however, Irvine lost the seat back to Labour's Jamie Cann.

Family
He is the son of Labour MP Sir Arthur Irvine, QC, who was Solicitor General.

References
Notes

Sources
Times Guide to the House of Commons 1992

External links 
 

1939 births
Living people
Conservative Party (UK) MPs for English constituencies
Members of the Parliament of the United Kingdom for Ipswich
UK MPs 1987–1992